Walter Grant (1884 – 5 November 1961) was an English professional footballer who played as an inside forward.

References

1884 births
1961 deaths
People from Cleethorpes
English footballers
Association football inside forwards
Grimsby Town F.C. players
Grimsby Rangers F.C. players
Chesterfield F.C. players
Cleethorpes Town F.C. players
English Football League players